August Werner (6 March 1896 – 20 October 1968) was a German international footballer.

References

1896 births
1968 deaths
Association football defenders
German footballers
Germany international footballers
Holstein Kiel players